Michael Geiger (born 27 September 1960) is a former German footballer and current manager. As a player, he spent five seasons in the Bundesliga with Eintracht Braunschweig, as well as three seasons in the 2. Bundesliga with Braunschweig and VfL Wolfsburg.

Geiger was never capped by the senior Germany national team, but at one point he was the country's most ever capped player at the youth level, having played through all age groups up to the West German U-21.

Honours

 UEFA European Under-21 Football Championship runner-up: 1982

References

External links

1960 births
Living people
Sportspeople from Heilbronn
Footballers from Baden-Württemberg
Association football defenders
German footballers
German football managers
Germany youth international footballers
Germany under-21 international footballers
Eintracht Braunschweig players
VfL Wolfsburg players
Bundesliga players
2. Bundesliga players